Jason Kelly is a baseball coach and former player, who is the current head baseball coach of the Washington Huskies. He played college baseball for the Cal Poly Mustangs, the Cuesta Cougars and the Missouri Valley Vikings.

Playing career
Kelly grew up in Santa Maria, California, where he attended St. Joseph High School. As a junior at St. Joseph, Kelly posted a 14–0 record with an earned run average (ERA) of 1.45, and recorded 107 strikeouts in 87 innings pitched, earning him Santa Maria Times All-Area MVP. Kelly enrolled at California Polytechnic State University, San Luis Obispo, where he played baseball for the Mustangs. As a freshman in 1999, Kelly pitched to a 3–1 record, a 7.91 ERA. and 30 innings pitched. In his second season, he redshirted. For the 2001 season, Kelly transferred to Cuesta College, where he pitched for the Cougars' head coach, Larry Lee. Kelly led the team with ten wins and  innings pitched, also getting named First Team All-Western State Conference. Kelly would finish his career playing for the Missouri Valley Vikings during the 2002 season.

Coaching career
Kelly began his coaching career as a volunteer assistant for the Cal Poly Mustangs, a job he supplemented while also working at a local grocery store. The following year, he got his first full-time assist job, being named the pitching coach at Chico State. Kelly would reunite with Larry Lee, joining his staff at Cal Poly as the pitching coach.

On August 16, 2012, Kelly was named the pitching coach of the Washington Huskies. Kelly helped elevate Huskie pitching, culminating in a 2018 College World Series appearance. For his efforts during that season, he was named d1baseball.com's Assistant Coach of the Year. At the conclusion of the 2019 season, Kelly left the Huskies to take the same position with the Arizona State Sun Devils. Following head coach Tracy Smith's dismissal, Kelly left Arizona State to become the pitching coach of the LSU Tigers.

On June 24, 2022, Kelly was named the head coach of the Washington Huskies.

Head coaching record

References

External links
Washington Huskies bio

Living people
Arizona State Sun Devils baseball coaches
Cal Poly Mustangs baseball coaches
Cal Poly Mustangs baseball players
Chico State Wildcats baseball coaches
Cuesta Cougars baseball coaches
Cuesta Cougars baseball players
LSU Tigers baseball coaches
Missouri Valley Vikings baseball players
Washington Huskies baseball coaches
Year of birth missing (living people)